Kashkar is an ancient city of Mesopotamia.

Kashkar may also refer to:
 Kaškar, a former city and current titular see of Oman
 Kashkar (East Syriac Diocese), a former diocese of the Church of the East
 Kashkar, an alternative name for Chitral, a city in Pakistan
 Kashkar, or Qashqari, an alternative name of the Khowar language of Pakistan
 Kara-Kashkar, a village in Kyrgyzstan

See also 
 Kaskar (disambiguation)
 Kashgar, an oasis city in Xinjiang, China
 Kashmar, city and capital of Kashmar County